Magnus Worziger Klein Rasmussen (born 18 April 1993) is a Danish footballer.

Career
Rasmussen came up through the youth academy of Nordsjælland, before moving to Danish second-division BSV in 2013.

Rasmussen signed with USL side Louisville City FC on 12 February 2015. Rasmussen scored Louisville City's first ever competitive goal against Saint Louis FC in the opening game on 28 March 2015. He totaled eight goals and four assists in LouCity's inaugural season.

In June 2016, he returned to the field after seven months of recovery from hip labral tear surgery. He rejoined the starting lineup in August. He made the USL Team of the Week twice with his first three goals.

After spending the 2017 season with the Danish side BK Frem, Rasmussen returned to Louisville City FC for the 2018 season. On 31 July 2020, Louisville and Rasmussen mutually agreed to terminate his contract, allowing Rasmussen to remain overseas during the COVID-19 pandemic, but with the option to have him return to the club for their 2021 season.

Honours

Club
Louisville City FC
USL Cup (1): 2018

Individual
USL All League First Team: 2019

References

External links

 Magnus Rasmussen at Louisville City FC
 
 

1993 births
Living people
Danish men's footballers
Danish expatriate men's footballers
Louisville City FC players
Association football midfielders
Expatriate soccer players in the United States
USL Championship players
Footballers from Copenhagen